Wright County is an historic county located in the Canadian province of Quebec. Canadian Prime Minister William Lyon Mackenzie King died here on July 22, 1950.

Former counties of Quebec